Chionanthus plurifloroides grows as a tree up to  tall, with a trunk diameter of up to . The bark is yellowish grey or dark brown. The flowers are yellow green. Habitat is mixed dipterocarp forest, from sea-level to  altitude. C. plurifloroides is endemic to Borneo.

References

plurifloroides
Plants described in 2002
Endemic flora of Borneo
Trees of Borneo